Non-Stop: Mexico to Jamaica is the eighth studio album by Ozomatli, released on Cleopatra Records in May 2017. Ozomatli teamed up with other Latin superstars in the making of the album. Several tracks in this album involved a reggae twist on some classic Latin songs.

Track listing

References

External links
Ozomatli - Non-Stop: Mexico to Jamaica (CD)

2017 albums
Ozomatli albums
Cleopatra Records albums